Ernest Frederick Newman  (2 March 1859 - 28 April 1928) was  Archdeacon of Plymouth from 1921 to 1928.

He was  educated at Marlborough and Keble College, Oxford and ordained in 1885. After a curacy at  Reading Minster he became a Chaplain to the Forces serving at the Tower of London and in Bengal, Caterham, South Africa  (where he was Mentioned in despatches)   and Portsmouth until his Archdeacon’s appointment.

Notes

1859 births
People educated at Marlborough College
Alumni of Keble College, Oxford
Archdeacons of Plymouth
1928 deaths